Footprints in the Sand 《足印》 is a Malaysian television series co-produced by Double Vision and ntv7. It is aired every Monday to Thursday, at 10:00pm on Malaysia's ntv7. This drama started airing on 19 April 2011 on the Malaysian channel.

Synopsis

Cast

References

External links
Official Trailer with English subtitle
Promo
First opening sequence
Second opening sequence
Third opening sequence
Watch Footprints on tonton

Chinese-language drama television series in Malaysia
2011 Malaysian television series debuts
2011 Malaysian television series endings
NTV7 original programming